Conyers is an Atlanta suburb, the county seat of and only city in Rockdale County, Georgia, United States. The city is 24 miles (38.6 km) east of downtown Atlanta and is a part of the Atlanta Metropolitan Area. As of the 2010 census, the city population was 15,195. The formerly separate town of Milstead is now part of Conyers.

History  
 

Between 1816 and 1821, the area known as Rockdale was open for settlement. John Holcomb, a blacksmith, was the first settler in what is now Conyers. He settled where the current Rockdale County Courthouse is located, in the middle of Conyers on Main Street.

Eventually, pressure arose for a railroad to cross Georgia; the railroad was intended to run from Augusta, through neighboring Covington to Marthasville (now known as Atlanta). John Holcomb was against the railroad and refused to sell his land, and threatened to shoot anyone from the railroad who came onto his property.

Dr. W. D. Conyers, a banker from Covington, eventually persuaded John Holcomb into selling his land for $700. Dr. Conyers then sold the land to the Georgia Railroad. What is now Conyers began as a watering post along this line, named after Dr. Conyers. By 1845, the railroad was in full operation. By 1854, nearly 400 residents lived around the watering post, and Conyers was incorporated.

Conyers has been nearly destroyed several times by fire. It is said to have survived Sherman's March to the Sea due to a friend of Sherman's who lived in the area between Conyers and Covington. The story goes that the houses were spared because Sherman was uncertain where his friend lived.

In 1870, the surrounding area was incorporated into Rockdale County out of Newton County, Georgia, and Conyers became the county seat.

Over the next decade, Conyers grew into a wild town. It had 12 saloons and five brothels. The more reputable side of the town had 40 stores, Conyers College, a hotel, a carriage manufacturer, and good schools.

The Conyers post office contains a mural, The Ploughman, painted in 1940 by Elizabeth Terrell. Murals were produced from 1934 to 1943 in the United States through the Section of Painting and Sculpture, later called the Section of Fine Arts, of the Treasury Department. The Works Progress Administration was the largest and most ambitious American New Deal agency, employing individuals to carry out public works projects.

Conyers was also home to "sidewalk churches". Along Main Street grew First Methodist, Conyers Presbyterian, and First Baptist. At some point, the congregants are thought to have persuaded the brothels and saloons to close and leave Conyers for Covington, using a mob. This rose out of revivals begun in 1878 with the Methodist and Presbyterian churches. First Baptist Church of Conyers moved out of downtown in late 2000, moving about 2 mi (3 km) south of the Georgia International Horse Park to their current location.

Tightly connected to Conyers is Milstead, a mill town now incorporated into Conyers. At its peak, Milstead and Conyers had a private railroad that delivered products, such as cotton, from the mill to Conyers for shipping to the textile mills. In the 1960s, the mill closed.

In 1944, a Trappist monastery (a Catholic order), Abbey of the Holy Spirit, was established south of the city by Dom Frederic Dunne. The Protestant community of Rockdale County helped with the completing of the current structure. M. Basil Pennington, one of the founders of the Centering Prayer movement, was abbot of the monastery from 2000 to 2002.

In the 1950s, Conyers had a Coca-Cola bottling facility. In 1957, Lithonia Lighting moved from Lithonia.

In the 1960s, Interstate 20 was built through the county. 

In the 1970s, parts of the first five episodes of the Dukes of Hazzard were filmed in the town.

In the 1980s, Conyers became known for "White Road", where resident Nancy Fowler claimed to have seen apparitions of the Virgin Mary. Throughout the late 1980s and early 1990s, Conyers played host to pilgrims.

In the early 1990s, several scenes of In the Heat of the Night were filmed around the Conyers Depot.  Alan Autry, who played the character of Captain Bubba Skinner, was seen as a regular around Conyers during the filming.

In 1996, Conyers hosted the equestrian and mountain biking events for the 1996 Olympic Games held in Atlanta. For this, Conyers built the Georgia International Horse Park.

On May 20, 1999 a school shooting took place known as the Heritage High School shooting. Six students were injured before the 15-year-old gunman surrendered to the police.

In October 1999, Rockdale County, and by extension the county seat of Conyers, gained substantial notoriety when the Public Broadcasting Service series Frontline aired a nationwide documentary entitled The Lost Children of Rockdale County detailing a syphilis outbreak among middle- and high-school-aged teenagers within the county. The documentary was well received outside Conyers, with rave reviews from such outlets as The Wall Street Journal and Entertainment Weekly.

In 2010, Conyers was thrust into the spotlight when identical twins and former residents Tasmiyah Janeesha Whitehead and Jasmiyah Kaneesha Whitehead (both born November 27, 1993) were arrested on May 21, 2010 for having committed matricide. The victim was Jarmecca Yvonne Whitehead (born April 18, 1975), who also went by the nickname "Nikki". She was beaten and stabbed and placed in a tub full of water where her daughters left her to die as they left for Rockdale County High School. The crime occurred on January 13, 2010, in the Bridle Ridge Walk subdivision on Appaloosa Way. The crime sent shockwaves throughout the community. Jarmecca's autopsy revealed that she suffered injuries to her lungs and jugular vein, and had a severed spinal cord. Initially, the twins proclaimed their innocence, but in 2014, they pleaded guilty and are serving 30-year sentences in separate prisons.  The crime was featured in a few true-crime documentaries and television shows, which include Dateline NBC in an episode titled "Bad Blood", Snapped episode 1403 titled "The Whitehead Twins", and Evil Twins in an episode titled "Honor Roll Killers", a show that airs on the Investigation Discovery network (see also Murder of Nikki Whitehead).

From 2013 to 2018, the CW show The Originals was filmed in Conyers.

Geography 
Conyers is located at  (33.666360, −84.007574).

The city is located in the eastern part of Metro Atlanta along Interstate 20, which provides access to the city from exits 80 and 82. I-20 leads west 24 mi (39 km) to downtown Atlanta and east 122 mi (196 km) to Augusta. U.S. Route 278 also runs through the city, concurrent with I-20. Other highways that run through the city include Georgia State Routes 20 and 138. GA-20 leads northeast 16 mi (26 km) to Loganville and southwest 20 mi (32 km) to McDonough. GA-138 leads northeast 21 mi (34 km) to Monroe and southwest 18 mi (29 km) to Stockbridge. 

Demographics

2020 census

As of the 2020 United States Census, there were 17,305 people, 6,300 households, and 3,848 families residing in the city.

2010 census
As of the census of 2010, 15,195 people, 5,661 households, and 3,642 families resided in the city. The 4,183 housing units averaged 355.1 per square mile (137.1/km). The racial makeup of the city was 24.3% White, 55.8% African American, 0.2% Native American, 1.4% Asian, 0.5% from other races, and 1.5% from two or more races. Hispanics or Latinos of any race were 16.3% of the population.

Of the 3,910 households, 34.2% had children under the age of 18 living with them, 37.5% were married couples living together, 21.0% had a female householder with no husband present, and 34.6% were not families. About 26.4% of all households were made up of individuals, and 7.9% had someone living alone who was 65 years of age or older. The average household size was 2.67 and the average family size was 3.17.

In the city, the population was distributed as 27.3% under the age of 18, 12.6% from 18 to 24, 33.1% from 25 to 44, 17.4% from 45 to 64, and 9.6% who were 65 years of age or older. The median age was 30 years. For every 100 females, there were 94.5 males. For every 100 females age 18 and over, there were 91.1 males.

The median income for a household in the city was $35,789, and for a family was $38,255. Males had a median income of $29,991 versus $24,879 for females. The per capita income for the city was $15,805. About 13.7% of families and 16.9% of the population were below the poverty line, including 24.5% of those under age 18 and 9.1% of those age 65 or over.

Education 
The Rockdale County School District holds preschool to grade 12, and consists of 11 elementary schools, four middle schools, three high schools, and four non-traditional schools. The district has 889 full-time teachers and over 13,801 students.

Sports 
East Atlanta FC is a semi-professional soccer club that plays in the United Soccer League 2. The team is composed of college players who play in the summer months at Rockdale Youth Soccer Association at Team Rehabilitation field. The club also features a youth team that plays in the USL academy league and also has a partnership with Rockdale Youth Soccer Association as a Youth Development Partner.

Notable people
 Tyler Austin, former Major League Baseball (MLB) player and current (NPB) player for the Yokohama DeNA Baystars
 Jill Arrington, sports anchor at KCBS-TV, formerly with Fox Sports 1 and CBS Sports
 Dr Heavenly Kimes, Married to Medicine
 Billy Buckner, MLB pitcher 
 Jesse Baker, former National Football League (NFL) defensive end with the Houston Oilers and Dallas Cowboys
 Jerome Boger, NFL referee
 Chris Cockrum, NASCAR driver
 David Elder, former MLB player
 Dakota Fanning, actress
 Elle Fanning, actress
 Candace Hill, 100-m and 200-m sprint IAAF World Youth Championship winner
 Holly Hunter, actress
 Grady Jarrett, NFL player for the Atlanta Falcons
 Ben L. Jones, "Crazy" Cooter Davenport in The Dukes of Hazzard and politician
 DeForest Kelley, Dr. Leonard "Bones" McCoy, of TV's Star Trek: The Original Series
 Ashley Scott, artist and writer
 Matt Kennon, singer
 Clint Mathis, World Cup soccer player
 Jack McBrayer, actor
 James C. Miller III, former U.S. government official and economist
 Cartel's Will Pugh, Joseph Pepper, Nic Hudson, Kevin Sanders, and Ryan Roberts
 Scott Russell, WSBK Champion, five-time Daytona winner
 Marion Tinsley, checkers expert
 Dave Willis, co-creator of Aqua Teen Hunger Force and Squidbillies
 Janice Shaw Crouse
 Geoff Collins, head coach of Georgia Tech Football
 Marcus Printup, jazz trumpeter with Wynton Marsalis and the Jazz at Lincoln Center Orchestra
 Buck Farmer Professional Baseball Pitcher 
Johnny Rapid, actor.

References

External links 
 
 Rockdale County Historical Society
 Walk of Heroes Veteran War Memorial, Conyers, Georgia
 Historic District – Olde Town Conyers, Georgia
 

Cities in Georgia (U.S. state)
Cities in Rockdale County, Georgia
County seats in Georgia (U.S. state)